Yusof Ghani (born 1950 in Johor, Malaysia) is a Malaysian painter, sculptor, writer, professor and curator. His career spans over three decades which resulted into diverse series that deals with Southeast Asian motifs with an Abstract Expressionist approach. His works blend painting and drawing into a visual entity with controlled play of sculptural and collage elements.

Early life and education

As a young boy in a small town in Johor, he enjoyed watching movies in a small cinema close to his house that was run by a family member. Watching Western movies such as cowboy films developed his interest in painting to depict movement visually and a sense of time in his pictures early on. Originally a graphic artist in Malaysia between 1969 and 1979, Yusof Ghani's transition to fine arts started when he received a scholarship from the government of Malaysia to study graphic arts at George Mason University, Virginia, in 1979. It was there that he met Walter Kravitz, a professor in painting, who introduced him to fine arts.

He soon became interested in the works of the American Abstract Expressionist painters such as Jackson Pollock and Willem de Kooning. After receiving the Dr. Burt Amanda Scholarship for the most outstanding student of art, Yusof took classes in fine arts and eventually graduated with a bachelor's degree. He then continued to work for a master's degree at the Catholic University of America in Washington, D.C., and met Professor Tom Nakashima, who taught him the finer points in painting. While studying at the Catholic University, he be-friended the Malaysian artist Awang Damit whose style is influenced by Abstract Expressionism.

After he completed his master's degree, he had his first solo exhibition at the prestigious Anton Gallery in Washington, D.C. His Protest series, which protested the US intervention in Nicaragua and El Salvador at that time, was well received and even drew rave reviews from The Washington Posts art critic – Jo Ann Lewis.

Career

Upon returning to Malaysia, Yusof continued to work with a series of collection called Tari (Dance), Topeng (Mask), Wayang (Theater), Hijau (Green), Segerak (A Movement), Biring (Fighting Cockerals), Wajah (Faces), and currently working on Ombak (Waves).

Currently, his mature works deals with contemporary issues concerning Malaysian society such as social issues regarding famine and injustice, the nation's history, distortions of Asian motifs and depiction of visual energy.
Ghani was an associate professor at the Faculty of Art and Design, Universiti Teknologi MARA, Selangor, Malaysia. While at UiTM, He taught many young artists that became popular contemporary artists in Malaysia such as Yusri Sulaiman. He is currently represented by ESPI Fine Arts in Malaysia.

He has done a number of successful solo and group shows in-

Solo shows –

Indonesia  –  Wajah II (2010)
Canada  –  Wajah (2009)
Hong Kong  –  Segerak IV (2008)
Malaysia  –  Segerak III (2006), Segerak (2004), Hijau 1998 – 2002 (2002), Topeng (1993), Tari (1989)
USA (Washington and San Francisco) – Topeng – Wayang (1997), Protest (1984)
Singapore  –  Hijau – Rhythm of Nature (2000), Topeng III (1996)

Group Shows –

Malaysia
Beijing, China
Wanchai, Hong Kong
Karachi, Pakistan
Bangkok, Thailand
Singapore
London, U.K
New York City
San Francisco, USA
Abu Dhabi, UAE
New Delhi, India
Madrid, Spain
Tokyo, Japan
Baghdad, Iraq
Washington, USA

His works are in numerous public collections such as –

Amerada Hess, Kuala Lumpur Malaysia
Anton Gallery, Washington DC, USA
Artfolio Gallery, Singapore
Ascott, Kuala Lumpur, Malaysia
Bank Negara Malaysia, Kuala Lumpur, Malaysia
BASF, Kuala Lumpur, Malaysia
CCM, Kuala Lumpur, Malaysia
Changi Airport, Singapore
Concorde Hotel, Shah Alam, Malaysia
DIGI Telecommunication, Kuala Lumpur, Malaysia
Earl Lu Gallery, Singapore
Equatorial Hotel, Penang/Kuala Lumpur, Malaysia
Galeri Citra, Kuala Lumpur, Malaysia
Galeri Shah Alam, Shah Alam, Malaysia
HEITECH PADU, Subang Jaya, Malaysia
Hijjaz Kasturi & Associates, Kuala Lumpur, Malaysia
Istana Mestika, Shah Alam, Malaysia
Istana Negara, Kuala Lumpur, Malaysia
Jenkins Johnson Gallery, San Francisco, USA
Kelab Darul Ehsan, Kuala Lumpur, Malaysia
Malayan Banking, Kuala Lumpur, Malaysia
Malaysia Mining Corporation, Kuala Lumpur, Malaysia
Malaysian Airlines, Kuala Lumpur, Malaysia
MTC, Kuala Lumpur, Malaysia
National Art Gallery, Kuala Lumpur, Malaysia
Oriental Bank, Kuala Lumpur, Malaysia
Paremba, Kuala Lumpur, Malaysia
PNB, Kuala Lumpur, Malaysia
Petronas Refinery, Melaka, Malaysia
Petronas KLCC, Kuala Lumpur, Malaysia
Sapura Holding, Kuala Lumpur, Malaysia
Sheraton Hotel, Subang Jaya, Malaysia
Silterra Corporation, Malaysia
Singapore Art Museum, Singapore
Spanco Malaysia, Kuala Lumpur, Malaysia
Solar Alert, Malaysia
Southern Bank, Kuala Lumpur, Malaysia
Standard Chartered Bank, Kuala Lumpur, Malaysia
State Development Corporation, Kuching, Malaysia
The Aliya & Farouk Khan Collection, Kuala Lumpur, Malaysia
Tokyo Gas, Tokyo, Japan
UMW Toyota, Kuala Lumpur, Malaysia
UNILEVER, Kuala Lumpur, Malaysia
Wisma Putra, Putrajaya, Malaysia
Youth Center, Washington D.C, USA
YTL Corporation, Kuala Lumpur, Malaysia
Zain & Co, Kuala Lumpur, Malaysia

Private life

Yusof Ghani currently lives in Shah Alam, Malaysia with his wife and four children. He regularly exhibits and also curates shows for mid-career and young artists in and around Kuala Lumpur, Malaysia.

Yusof Ghani Paintings
Yusof Ghani artworks are displayed and exhibited in his Tapak Gallery in Shah Alam. To purchase his Ombak or Segerak series, browse through the stockroom of www.malaysianfineart.com

Notes

1950 births
Catholic University of America alumni
Malaysian painters
Malaysian sculptors
People from Johor
Living people